Jun Hee Lee is an American actor. He was born in St. Louis, Missouri and attended Boston University.

Acting career
Jun Hee Lee's film roles include: "Derrick" in Vampires Suck, "Jimmy" in American Pie: Band Camp, the titular character in the 2004 film Ethan Mao, and as "Kevin" in the gory independent horror film KatieBird *Certifiable Crazy Person.

His other TV credits include: "Quan" on The Mindy Project, "Simon" on House, and he also made guest starring roles in the popular Nickelodeon TV series Drake & Josh.

Lee also voiced the blind, teenage assassin "Con Smith" in the video game Killer7 for GameCube and PS2, and he was the host of AZN's prime TV show Asia Street as well as the host for AZN's most watched music video show Revolution.

Filmography

References

External links

American male film actors
Boston University alumni
Living people
Male actors from St. Louis
Year of birth missing (living people)
American male actors of Korean descent
American male television actors
American male video game actors
21st-century American male actors